Stuart Gitlow (born November 29, 1962) is a general, forensic, and addiction psychiatrist and Past President of the American Society of Addiction Medicine.

Biography
Gitlow was born on November 29, 1962. Following completion of his bachelor of science degree from the Massachusetts Institute of Technology, he earned an M.D. from Mount Sinai School of Medicine, a Master of Public Health degree from the University of Pittsburgh and Master of Business Administration degree from the University of Rhode Island (Beta Gamma Sigma). His psychiatric and public health training were at the University of Pittsburgh Medical Center and Harvard University for his forensic fellowship.

Gitlow has held a number of prominent professional positions in the medicine and public health communities. He served as medical expert to the Social Security Department's Office of Hearings Operations, Past President of the American Society of Addiction Medicine, American Society of Addiction Medicine delegate to the American Medical Association, and past chair of the American Medical Association Council on Science and Public Health.

Gitlow currently serves on the editorial board of the Journal of Addictive Diseases, on the Board of Directors of the New York County Medical Society, on the Board of Directors of Oxford House, Inc., and on the Addiction Psychiatry Examination Committee for the American Board of Psychiatry and Neurology. He is an Aviation Medical Examiner for the Federal Aviation Administration, and for many years served as a consultant to the Federal Air Surgeon on matters of addiction and psychiatry. He has served as medical expert on over 3500 legal cases since 1994, working with federal and state law enforcement, with public defense and on additional private, regulatory, and administrative matters.

According to the Centers for Medicare and Medicaid Services, Gitlow has received more than US $65,000 in funding since 2013. This includes more than US $16,000 in consulting payments from Janssen Pharmaceuticals, a subsidiary of Johnson & Johnson.  He has also received more than $43,000 in fees for consulting with multiple pharmaceutical firms including Kaleo, Inc, makers of the opioid overdose antidote Evzio (Naloxone HCl injection); Reckitt Benckiser, makers of Suboxone; and Orexo, makers of the opioid products Abstral (Fentanyl) and Zubsolv (Buprenorphine/naloxone).

Academia
Formerly on faculty at Harvard, Dartmouth, and Mount Sinai School of Medicine, Gitlow was most recently a faculty member at the University of Florida.

Politics
Gitlow has twice unsuccessfully sought election to the Rhode Island General Assembly as representative for Woonsocket, Rhode Island district 49.

On March 17, 2018, Gitlow's private residence and separate medical office were raided by the FBI as part of an ongoing investigation.

No subsequent information was ever given by authorities as to why the raid took place and no charges were ever brought regarding the investigation. As a result of the raids on Gitlow’s offices (and also the May 2018 raid of another respected physician’s offices, Tom Reach MD of Tennessee), the Washington-based DCBA Law & Policy organization sent a letter to President Trump requesting a dismissal of then-Attorney General Jeff Sessions and an end to unwarranted raids on reputable physicians who were federally registered prescribers of FDA-approved medications for the treatment of opioid addiction.

References 

Geisel School of Medicine faculty
Information architects
Physicians from New York City
University of Pittsburgh School of Public Health alumni
Harvard Medical School people
Living people
1962 births
Massachusetts Institute of Technology alumni
University of Rhode Island alumni
American psychiatrists
University of Utah faculty
Icahn School of Medicine at Mount Sinai alumni
Cannabis law reform in the United States